Muhammad Mushtaq Qadri Attari was a Pakistani religious Preacher and Poet (na'at khawan).

Early life
Mushtaq Qadri was born on the 18th of the month of Ramadan, 1386 A.H. (approximately 30 December 1966), in Bannu, Khyber Pakhtunkhwa, Pakistan.  His father's name was Akhlaq Ahmad.  Before permanently moving to Karachi, he lived for some time in Faisalabad.

In 1991 Mushtaq Qadri got married.  His nikah (matrimonial ceremony) was conducted by his mentor Muhammad Ilyas Qadri.

Religious influences
Mushtaq Qadri Attari was an associate of the spiritual guide and leader Maulana Muhammad Ilyas Qadri, the head of the  Barelvi Islamic movement Dawat-e-Islami.

In 1986, Mushtaq Qadri gave his spiritual allegiance (bay'ah) to Silsila Qadriya. 
Mushtaq Qadri is considered to be a mentor of Owais Qadri.

Religious positions
At first, Qadri was an imam at the Madinah Masjid, in Orangi Town, Karachi.  From 1995 until his death, he also served as an imām and speaker in Jamia Masjid Kanz-ul-Imān (Bābrī Chowk, Karachi, Pakistan.) He had memorized eight Juz (sections) of the Quran. He was also a qārī [one who recites the Quran with its proper recital guidelines]. He worked as an auditor for the government for many years. He taught the English language in Jā’amiāt-ul-Madinah (Sabz Market, Karachi, Pakistan). He performed the Hajj pilgrimage and visited the holy city of Medina, Saudi Arabia four times.

In the year 2000, he was appointed as the nigrān (head of Dawat-e-Islami's activities) of Karachi, Pakistan with the approval of all the nigrāns of Karachi.  Later, in October of the same year, he was appointed as the nigrān of Markazī Majlis-e-Shūrā (Dawat-e-Islami's Central Council).

Due to his dedication to the cause of Dawat-e-Islami, he earned the title Aṭṭār kā Peyārā (the cherished one of Attar).  "Attar" refers to Maulana Muhammad Ilyas Attar Qadri.

Non-commercialism
Mushtaq Attari had never accepted payment for reciting na'at poems. Recording companies had offered him handsome amounts for releasing his albums, but he had refused. He would never ask for a ride to take him to programs where he was invited for reciting, nor would he accept money for taxi fare.  He never accepted any money made from his recordings, and any proceeds would be forwarded toward funding Dawat-e-Islami projects.

Death
Towards the end of life, Mushtaq Qadri was suffering from throat and chest cancer, and could no longer speak. His spiritual guide, Ilyas Attar Qadri, who was in the United Arab Emirates at that time, phoned him and told him to recite the kalima (declaration of faith) and Mushtaq Qadri found himself, surprisingly, able to do so.  Mushtaq Qadri died on 29th Sha'aban 1423 A.H. (5 November 2002) in Karachi.

Upon hearing about his death, Muhammad Ilyas Attar Qadri immediately returned to Karachi from the United Arab Emirates.  The funeral prayer of Mushtaq Qadri was offered in Nishtar Park, Karachi, led by Ilyas Qadri, the founder of Dawat-e-Islami.  Mushtaq Qadri was buried in Sahrā-e-Madinah (near Toll Plaza, Karachi).

References

External links
 Haji Muhammad Mushtaq Attari Qadri Naats at DawateIslami.net
 Book About Haji Mushtaq Attari at FaizaneAttar.net

1967 births
2002 deaths
Barelvis
Pakistani performers of Islamic music
Pakistani Sunni Muslims
People from Faisalabad
Islamic music
Islamic poetry
Deaths from cancer in Pakistan
Deaths from throat cancer